Polavaram or Prolavaram is a village in Eluru district of the Indian state of Andhra Pradesh. It is located in Polavaram mandal of Jangareddygudem revenue division at about 35 km away from the banks of Godavari River. The Papi Hills and Polavaram Project are the major landmarks near the village.

History
Historically the area is known as Prolavaram. This area was under the rule of Kamma kings of Musunuri Nayakas. Kamma king Musunuri Prolayya, in 1330 AD donated Prolavaram village to Brahmins.  Prolavaram means, Prola is Prola and Varam is donation.

Geography
It has an average elevation of 16 metres (55 ft).

Demographics 

 Census of India, Polavaram had a population of 13861. The total population constitute, 6830 males and 7031 females with a sex ratio of 1029 females per 1000 males. 1431 children are in the age group of 0–6 years, with sex ratio of 890 The average literacy rate stands at 76.40%.

See also
Polavaram Project

References

External links

Villages in Eluru district